"First Time" is a song by Norwegian DJ Kygo and English singer Ellie Goulding. It was released on 28 April 2017, as the second single from Kygo's first EP, Stargazing (2017).

Music video 
On 12 May 2017, Kygo and Ellie Goulding released teasers for the upcoming music video on Instagram and Twitter.

The music video was released on 22 May 2017 on Kygo's YouTube channel. It was directed by American director Mathew Cullen.
As of November 2020, the music video has over 102 million views.

Track listing

Credits and personnel 
Credits adapted from Tidal.

 Kygo – composer, producer
 Ellie Goulding – lyricist, vocalist
 Jeremy Chacon – composer
 Jonas Kalisch – composer
 Alexsej Vlasenko – composer
 Henrik Meinke – composer
 Fanny Hultman – lyricist
 Jenson Vaughan – lyricist
 Sara Hjellström – lyricist
 Hitimpulse – producer
 Serban Ghenea – mixing engineer
 Randy Merrill – mastering engineer
 John Hanes – engineer
 Joe Kearns – vocal producer

Charts

Weekly charts

Year-end charts

Certifications

References 

2017 singles
2017 songs
Ellie Goulding songs
Kygo songs
Song recordings produced by Kygo
Songs written by Ellie Goulding
Songs written by Jenson Vaughan
Songs written by Jeremy Chacon
Songs written by Kygo
Songs written by Shy Martin
Sony Music singles
Ultra Music singles